American Cinematographer is a magazine published monthly by the American Society of Cinematographers. It focuses on the art and craft of cinematography, covering domestic and foreign feature productions, television productions, short films, music videos and commercials. The emphasis is on interviews with cinematographers, but directors and other filmmakers are often featured as well. Articles include technical how-to pieces, discussions of tools and technologies that affect cinematography, and historical features.

History
The American Society of Cinematographers was founded in 1919. It began publishing American Cinematographer on November 1, 1920, as a twice-monthly four-page newsletter about the ASC and its members. In 1922, the publication went monthly. In 1929, editor Hal Hall started to change the publication; he reformatted it to standard magazine size, increased the page count, and included more articles on amateur filmmaking. For a while during the 1930s, the magazine was devoted to professional cinematography and amateur moviemaking in equal measure. In 1937, the ASC purchased a Spanish bungalow, near Grauman's Chinese Theatre, at 1782 North Orange Drive in Hollywood, California, which remains the headquarters of the ASC.

Modern era
Contributors to the magazine include its staff editors, freelance writers, cinematographers (including ASC members) and other filmmakers. The magazine has won several Maggie Awards and Folio: Eddie Awards for editorial excellence, and several awards for individual articles.

In 2006, the magazine introduced a digital edition. An app for iOS is currently available, and other versions of the app are in the works. The magazine's website (www.theasc.com) features a blog by John Bailey, ASC, and occasional blogs by contributing writers.

Chronology of executive editors
 "Captain Jack" Poland (1920–1921)
 Mary B Howe (1921)
 Silas Edgar Snyder (1921–March 1922, September 1927–April 1929)
 Foster Gross (August 1922–August 1927)
 Hal Hall (May 1929–September 1932, September 1943–December 1945)
 Charles J. VerHalen (October 1932–February 1937)
 George Blaisdell (March 1937–December 1940)
 William Stull, ASC (January 1941–August 1943)
 Walter R. Greene (January 1946–June 1948)
 Arthur Gavin (July 1948–January 1965)
 Herb Lightman (February 1965, February 1966–June 1982)
 Will Lane (March 1965)
 Don C. Hoefler (April 1965–January 1966)
 Richard Patterson (July 1982–April 1985)
 George Turner (May 1986–January 1992)
 David Heuring (February 1992–June 1995)
 Stephen Pizzello (July 1995–present)

See also
 List of film periodicals

References

Sources
 Birchard, Robert S. "Shaping Cinematography's 'Magazine of Record'". American Cinematographer Magazine, August 2004, Vol. 85, No 8. pp. 66–75.
 Katz, Ephraim. The Film Encyclopedia, Second edition. New York: HarperCollins Publishers, 1994. p. 54. .
 Konigsberg, Ira. The Complete Film Dictionary. New York: Signet, 1987. p. 11. .
 Mitchell, George. "The ASC Is an Honor Society, Not a Trade Union, of Cinematographers". Films in Review, August–September 1967. pp. 385–397.
 Slide, Anthony. The American Film Industry: A Historical Dictionary. New York: Limelight Editions, 1990. p. 17. .
 Williams, Whitney. "Society of Cinematographers Marks 50 Years of Achievement". Daily Variety, January 17, 1969. pp. 10, 16.

External links
 
 
 Archived American Cinematographer magazines on the Internet Archive

American Society of Cinematographers
Film magazines published in the United States
Magazines established in 1920
Magazines published in Los Angeles
Monthly magazines published in the United States